Vyarheychyk is a Belarusian surname Notable people with the surname include:

Kiryl Vyarheychyk (born 1991), Belarusian footballer
Yury Vyarheychyk (born 1968), Belarusian footballer and manager, father of Kiryl

Belarusian-language surnames